Eudesmia laetifera is a moth of the subfamily Arctiinae first described by Francis Walker in 1865. It is found in Mexico, Guatemala, Panama and Colombia.

References

Eudesmia
Moths described in 1865